Two Lovers is a 1928 American silent historical drama film directed by Fred Niblo and starring Vilma Bánky, Ronald Colman, and Noah Beery. Based on the novel Leatherface: A Tale of Old Flanders by Baroness Emma Orczy, it was produced by Samuel Goldwyn.

Cast

Production
The working title of the film was Leatherface, an alias used by Colman's character and the title of the novel the film was based upon. The film premiered as a silent film in New York City in March 1928, and was later rereleased in August 1928 with a synchronized music soundtrack.

Preservation
An incomplete 35mm print with three reels missing survives in the Museum of Modern Art film archive, along with a 16mm viewing copy.

References

External links

Stills at silenthollywood.com
Sheet music cover and still at silentfilmstillarchive.com

1928 films
American silent feature films
Transitional sound films
American black-and-white films
Films directed by Fred Niblo
Samuel Goldwyn Productions films
1928 drama films
American drama films
Films set in the 16th century
Films set in Flanders
Films set in the Netherlands
Cultural depictions of William the Silent
Films based on works by Emma Orczy
1920s American films
Silent American drama films
1920s English-language films